Sebacoyl chloride (or sebacoyl dichloride) is a di-acyl chloride, with formula (CH2)8(COCl)2.  A colorless oily liquid with a pungent odor, it is soluble in hydrocarbons and ethers. Sebacoyl chloride is corrosive; like all acyl chlorides, it hydrolyzes, evolving hydrogen chloride. It is less susceptible to hydrolysis though than shorter chain aliphatic acyl chlorides.

Preparation
Sebacoyl chloride can be prepared by reacting sebacic acid with an excess of thionyl chloride. Residual thionyl chloride can be removed by distillation.

Use 
Sebacoyl chloride can be polymerized with hexamethylenediamine yielding nylon-6,10.

See also
 Sebacic acid
 Adipoyl chloride

References

Acyl chlorides
Monomers